Thomas Kotcheff (born 1988) is an American composer and pianist who currently resides in Los Angeles. He is a winner of a 2016 Charles Ives Prize from the American Academy of Arts and Letters and a 2015 Presser Foundation Music Award.

Biography 
Kotcheff was born in Wilmington, North Carolina and raised in Los Angeles, California. His parents are Laifun Chung and director Ted Kotcheff, and he has an older sister, Alexandra. He began taking piano lessons at the age of 4 and in 2006 he graduated from Los Angeles County High School for the Arts. In 2010, Kotcheff completed a Bachelor of Music in Piano Performance from Peabody Institute of Johns Hopkins University and then attended USC Thornton School of Music from 2010 to 2019 where he received a Masters of Master of Music and a Doctor of Music in Music Composition. He studied composition with Stephen Hartke, Donald Crockett, Frank Ticheli, and Steven Stucky, and piano with Benjamin Pasternack and Stewart L. Gordon.

Kotcheff serves as Ear Training and Music Theory Faculty at the Colburn School He is a teaching artist at the Los Angeles Philharmonic Composer Fellowship Program. Kotcheff has held residencies at Festival International d'Art Lyrique d'Aix-en-Provence, the Los Angeles Philharmonic's National Composers Intensive, The Hermitage Artist Retreat, The Studios of Key West, and The Kimmel Harding Nelson Center for the Arts.

As a new music pianist, Thomas has dedicated himself to commissioning and premiering new piano works. In 2020, his performance of Frederic Rzewski's Songs of Insurrection was awarded Best Instrumental Recital Performance in Los Angeles by San Francisco Classical Voice's Audience Choice Awards. He released the world premiere recording of "Songs of Insurrection" on the Coviello Contemporary label.

Kotcheff is a founding member of the new music piano duo HOCKET with Sarah Gibson. He serves as a content contributor to 91.5 KUSC and is a livestream broadcast host for the Ojai Music Festival.

Selected works

Selected awards and grants
2021 Illinois State University College of Fine Arts RED NOTE New Music Festival Composition Competition
2018 New York Youth Symphony First Music Commission
2016 Charles Ives Prize (Charles Ives Scholarship) American Academy of Arts and Letters
2015 Presser Foundation Graduate Music Award
2015 BMI Foundation Student Composer Award
2014 Aspen Music Festival Hermitage Prize

Discography
Frederic Rzewski: Songs of Insurrection (2020) Coviello Contemporary COV 92021

Film 
Kotcheff provided the score to the 2019 independent film The Planters.

References

External links

21st-century American composers
American classical composers
Living people
1988 births
Johns Hopkins University alumni
University of Southern California alumni
21st-century American musicians
People from Los Angeles